The 1987 New York Yankees season was the 85th season for the Yankees. The team finished in fourth place with a record of 89-73, finishing 9 games behind the Detroit Tigers. New York was managed by Lou Piniella. The Yankees played at Yankee Stadium.

Offseason
 November 26, 1986: Doug Drabek, Brian Fisher, and Logan Easley were traded by the Yankees to the Pittsburgh Pirates for Rick Rhoden, Pat Clements and Cecilio Guante.
December 17, 1986: Lenn Sakata was signed as a free agent with the New York Yankees.
 December 19, 1986: Ron Romanick was traded by the California Angels with a player to be named later to the New York Yankees for a player to be named later and Butch Wynegar.
 January 5, 1987: Scott Nielsen and Mike Soper (minors) were traded by the Yankees to the Chicago White Sox for Randy Velarde and Pete Filson.
 January 8, 1987: Willie Randolph was signed as a free agent by the Yankees.
 February 13, 1987: Rick Cerone was signed as a free agent by the Yankees.

Regular season

The Yankees hit 10 grand slams, the most by an MLB team in 1987. Six of those were hit by Don Mattingly, who set a record for most grand slam home runs in one season with six. His record was matched by Travis Hafner during the 2006 season. Mattingly's grand slams in 1987 were also the only six grand slams of his career. In addition, Mattingly had tied Dale Long's major league record by hitting home runs in eight consecutive games (record later tied again by Ken Griffey Jr., of Seattle in 1993), as well as stroking an extra base hit in ten consecutive games. Mattingly had a record 10 home runs during this streak (Long & Griffey had eight of them).
In June 1987, it was reported that Mattingly injured his back during some clubhouse horseplay with pitcher Bob Shirley though both denied this. Nevertheless, he finished with a .327 batting average, 30 home runs, and 115 RBIs, his fourth straight year with at least 110 RBIs.

On July 13, 1987, George Steinbrenner told manager Lou Piniella that the acquisition of Steve Trout would win the Yankees the pennant. Trout never won a game for the Yankees, going 0–4 in 14 games.

Season standings

Record vs. opponents

Notable transactions
 April 10, 1987: Rich Bordi was signed as a free agent by the Yankees.
 May 15, 1987: Rafael Quirico was signed as an amateur free agent by the Yankees.
 June 10, 1987: Keith Hughes and Shane Turner were traded by the Yankees to the Philadelphia Phillies for Mike Easler.
 June 22, 1987: Alan Mills was sent by the California Angels to the New York Yankees to complete an earlier deal made on December 19, 1986.
 July 13, 1987: Bob Tewksbury, Rich Scheid, and Dean Wilkins were traded by the Yankees to the Chicago Cubs for Steve Trout.
 August 26, 1987: Dennis Rasmussen was traded by the Yankees to the Cincinnati Reds for Bill Gullickson.
 August 26, 1987: Ken Patterson and a player to be named later were traded by the Yankees to the Chicago White Sox for Jerry Royster and Mike Soper (minors). The New York Yankees completed the deal by sending Jeff Pries (minors) to the White Sox on September 19.
 September 17, 1987: Sherman Obando was signed as an amateur free agent by the Yankees.

Roster

Player stats

Batting

Starters by position
Note: Pos = Position; G = Games played; AB = At bats; H = Hits; Avg. = Batting average; HR = Home runs; RBI = Runs batted in

Other batters
Note: G = Games played; AB = At bats; H = Hits; Avg. = Batting average; HR = Home runs; RBI = Runs batted in

Pitching

Starting pitchers 
Note: G = Games pitched; IP = Innings pitched; W = Wins; L = Losses; ERA = Earned run average; SO = Strikeouts

Other pitchers 
Note: G = Games pitched; IP = Innings pitched; W = Wins; L = Losses; ERA = Earned run average; SO = Strikeouts

Relief pitchers 
Note: G = Games pitched; W = Wins; L = Losses; SV = Saves; ERA = Earned run average; SO = Strikeouts

Awards and records
Don Mattingly, American League record, Most Grand Slams in one season (6) 
 Don Mattingly, Silver Slugger Award

Farm system 

LEAGUE CHAMPIONS: Columbus, Fort Lauderdale

References

External links
1987 New York Yankees at Baseball Reference
1987 New York Yankees at Baseball Almanac

New York Yankees seasons
New York Yankees
New York Yankees
1980s in the Bronx